Charles, Charlie, Charley, Chuck or Chuckie Williams may refer to:

Actors
Charles Williams (English actor) (1693–1731), at Theatre Royal, Drury Lane
Charles Williams (American actor) (1898–1958), screenwriter
Charlie Williams (comedian) (1927–2006), English Yorkshire stand-up, former footballer

Artists
Charles Williams (caricaturist) (before 1775—1830), British illustrator
Charles Insco Williams (1853–1923), American artist and architect in Dayton, Ohio
Charles David Williams (1875–1954), American book and magazine illustrator (Cross burning)
Charles Williams (artist) (born 1965), American-English Stuckist movement painter
Charles T. Williams, American sculptor

Music and dance
Charles Holston Williams (1886–1978), American founder of dance company
Charles Williams (composer) (1893–1978), English film music
Charles Williams (musician) (born 1932), American jazz saxophonist
Charles Williams (album), 1971 release by saxophonist
Charles "Hungry" Williams (1935–1986), American R&B drummer from New Orleans

Politics
Charles Williams (of Llangibby) (1591–1641), English MP in 1621
Charles Hanbury Williams (1708–1759), Welsh MP and satirist
Charles K. Williams (1782–1853), American governor of Vermont
Charles Williams (before 1825—after 1865), American mayor of Rockford, Illinois, 1859–64
Watkin Williams (Liberal politician) (Charles James Watkin Williams, 1828–1884), Welsh MP for Caernarvonshire, 1880
Charles G. Williams (1829–1892), American congressman from Wisconsin
Charles Henry Williams (1834–1908), English MP for Barnstaple, 1868–1874
Charles Williams (Wisconsin state legislator) (1844–1922), American Democrat
Morgan Williams (politician) (Charles Morgan Williams, 1878–1970), New Zealand politician
Charles Williams (Torquay MP) (1886–1955), English politician
Charles Cromwell Williams (1896–1975), Canadian member of Legislative Assembly of Saskatchewan
Charles Williams (Australian politician), Labor member of Western Australian Legislative Council, 1928–1948
Charles Williams, Baron Williams of Elvel (1933–2019), English MP, cricketer, businessman

Sports

American football
Charles M. Williams (coach), football and basketball at Temple University, 1894–99
Chuck Williams (American football) (1934–2020), coach
Charles Williams (gridiron football) (born 1953), Canadian defensive back
Charlie Williams (American football) (born 1972), NFL safety for Dallas Cowboys

Association football
Charlie Williams (footballer, born 1873) (1873–1952), English goalkeeper and manager
Charles Williams (footballer, born 1912) (1912—after 1934), English footballer
Charlie Williams (footballer, born 1944), Maltese midfielder
Charlie Williams (comedian) (1927–2006), English centre-half, later performer

Baseball
Charles Williams (baseball) (1894–1952), American pitcher in Negro leagues
Charlie Williams (shortstop) (1903–1931), American shortstop in Negro leagues
Charlie Williams (umpire) (1943–2005), first African American behind home plate in World Series
Charlie Williams (pitcher) (1947–2015), American with Mets and Giants

Basketball
Charlie Williams (basketball) (born 1943), American point guard
Chuck Williams (basketball) (born 1946), American point guard
Chuckie Williams (born 1953), American shooting guard
Chaz Williams (born 1991), American point guard in Macedonian First League
Charles Williams (basketball) (born 1996), American shooting guard

Combat sports
Charley Williams (born 1928), American boxer
Charles Williams (boxer) (born 1962), American light heavyweight
Rockin' Rebel (Charles Williams, 1966–2018), American professional wrestler

Other sports
Charles Williams (cricketer, born 1800) (1800–1830), English underarm bowler with Marylebone
Charles Williams (Australian footballer) (1881–1969), with Richmond in VFL
Charles Williams (athlete) (1887–1971), English 1908 Olympian in track and field
Charles Williams (rackets) (1888–1935), English world champion and Titanic survivor
Charlie Williams (motorcyclist) (born 1950), English motorcyclist
Charles Williams (rugby union) South African player, 1976–1980
Charlie Williams (pool player) (born 1977), Korean-born American
Charles Williams (ice hockey) (born 1992), American goaltender

Writers

Fiction
Charles Williams (British writer) (1886–1945), English novelist, member of Inklings
Charles Williams (American author) (1909–1975), American author of suspense novels (Dead Calm, Hotspot,...)
C. K. Williams (Charles Kenneth Williams, 1936–2015), American poet
Charlie Williams (British writer) (born 1971), English author of The Mangel Trilogy
Charles Williams (film director) (born 1982), Australian screenwriter-director

Non-fiction
Charles Greville Williams (1829–1910), English scientist and analytical chemist
Charles Frederick Williams (1838–1904), Irish-Scottish newspaper editor and war correspondent
Charles Theodore Williams (1838–1912), English physician
Charles Tudor Williams (1839–1914), American businessman and educator
Charles D. Williams (1860–1923), American Episcopal bishop and theologian
C. Dickerman Williams (1900–1998), American lawyer and freedom-of-speech advocate
Charles Williams (priest) (1906–1961), Welsh Anglican theologian and chaplain of Merton College
Chuck Williams (author) (1915–2015), cookbook writer, founder of Williams-Sonoma
Charles M. Williams (academic) (1917–2011), American professor at Harvard Business School

Other
Charles Williams (academic) (1807–1877), English principal of Jesus College, Oxford
Charles Williams (brewer) (1850–1936), Australian pioneer in Adelaide
Charles Williams (Royal Navy officer) (1925–2015), South African-born rear admiral
Charles James Blasius Williams, English physician
Charles Q. Williams (1933–1982), American Army major, Medal of Honor recipient
Charles Andrew Williams (born 1986), perpetrator of the Santana High School shooting

See also
William Charles (disambiguation)